TickIT is a certification program for companies in the software development and computer industries, supported primarily by the United Kingdom and Swedish industries through UKAS and SWEDAC respectively. Its general objective is to improve software quality.

History
In the 1980s, the UK government's CCTA organisation promoted the use of IT standards in the UK public sector, with work on BS5750 (Quality Management) leading to the publishing of the Quality Management Library and the inception of the TickIT assessment scheme with DTI, MoD and participation of software development companies.

TickITplus
The TickIT scheme has been updated to become TickITplus, a new website TickITplus is now available.

TickITplus adds a new dimension to the existing TickIT Scheme combining industry best practice with International IT standards. It provides ISO 9001:2008 accredited certification with a Capability Grading for all sizes and types of IT organisations. It cross-references ISO/IEC 15504 (Information technology — Process assessment) and ISO/IEC 12207 (Systems and software engineering — Software life cycle processes) amongst others. In addition it promotes Auditor and Practitioner competency and training within established qualification standards.

Functions
In addition to a general objective of improving software quality, one of the principles of TickIT is to improve and regulate the behaviour of auditors working in the information technology sector through training, and subsequent certification of auditors. The International Register of Certificated Auditors manages the registration scheme for TickIT auditors.

Software development organizations seeking TickIT Certification are required to show conformity with ISO 9000.

Major objective was to provide industry with a practical framework for the management of software development quality by developing more effective quality management system certification procedures. These involved:
 publishing guidance material to assist software organizations interpret the requirements of ISO 9001
 training, selecting and registering auditors with IT experience and competence, and
 introducing rules for the accreditation of certification bodies practising in the software sector

The TickIT Guide 

TickIT also includes a guide. This provides guidance in understanding and applying ISO 9001 in the IT industry. It gives a background to the TickIT scheme, including its origins and objectives. Furthermore, it provides detailed information on how to implement a Quality System and the expected structure and content relevant to software activities. The TickIT guide also assists in defining appropriate measures and/or metrics.
The TickIT Guide contains the official guidance material for TickIT. It is directed at a wide audience: senior managers and operational staff of software suppliers and in-house development teams, purchasers and users of software based systems, certification bodies and accreditation authorities, third party and internal auditors, auditor training course providers and IT consultants.

Part A: Introduction to TickIT and the Certification Process
This presents general information about the operation of TickIT and how it relates to other quality initiatives such as Process Improvement.

Part B: Guidance for Customers
This describes the issues relating to quality management system certification in the software field from the viewpoint of the customer who is initiating a development project, and explains how the customer can contribute to the quality of the delivered products and services.

Part C: Guidance for Suppliers
This presents information and guidance to software and software service providing organizations, including in house developers, on the construction of their quality management systems using the TickIT procedures. This part also indicates how organizations can assess and improve the effectiveness of their quality management systems.

Part D: Guidance for Auditors
This gives guidance to auditors on the conduct of assessments using the TickIT procedures.

Part E: Software Quality Management System Requirements – Standards Perspective
This contains guidance to help organizations producing software products and providing software-related services interpret the requirements of BS EN ISO 9001:2000. It follows the clause sequence of the Standard.

Part F: Software Quality Management System Requirements – Process Perspective
This identifies and elaborates upon the good practice required to provide effective and continuous control of a software quality management system. It is organized around the basic processes required for software development, maintenance and support and follows the structure set out in ISO/IEC 12207:1995.

Appendix 1:	Management and Assessment of IT Processes
		
Appendix 2:	Case study: Using the EFQM Excellence Model

Appendix 3:	Case Study: ISO/IEC 15504 - Compatible Process Assessments

Appendix 4:	Case study: Software Process Improvement The CMMSM Way

Standards information and references

Glossary of terms

References

Bamford, Robert; Deibler, William (2003). ISO 9001: 2000 for Software and Systems Providers: An Engineering Approach (1st ed.). CRC-Press.

External links
TickITplus
IRCA
Certification bodies

Information assurance standards
Information technology governance
Information technology organisations based in the United Kingdom
Software quality